Der Graf von Gleichen D 918 is an unfinished 1827 opera in two acts by Franz Schubert after a libretto by Eduard Bauernfeld.

Composition
The opera is for four sopranos, two tenors, six basses, mixed choir and orchestra. Sketches of eleven numbers for Act I and nine numbers for Act II are extant:
 Akt I
 1. Introduktion: Es funkelt der Morgen (sketch)
 2. Rezitativ und Cavatine: O Himmel kannst du mir; Mein Weib, o Gott (sketch)
 3. Terzett: Wart nur wart (sketch)
 4. Duett: Ein Schiff? ein Schiff? (sketch)
 5a. Arie: Ihr Blumen, ihr Bäume (sketch)
 5b. Rezitativ und Duettritornell: Suleika! Mein Herr und Freund! (sketch)
 5c. Duett: Ich wünscht um dich zu schmücken (sketch)
 6. Marsch, Rezitativ, Arie und Chor: Ha! Was ist das? (sketch)
 7. Quintett: Wie Mondlicht durch die Wolken glänzt (sketch)
 8. Rezitativ und Arie: Himmel was mußt’ ich hören?; Ja ich lieb’ ihn (sketch)
 9. Lied: Tausend Frauen konnt’ ich schauen (sketch)
 10. Duett: Ob ich verstehe? (sketch)
 11. Finale I: Sie wird kommen (sketch)
 Akt II
 12. Chor: Laßt uns nicht feyern (sketch)
 13. Arie: Trocknet nicht Thränen der ewigen Liebe (sketch)
 14. Chor: Vaterland nimm uns auf in deinen Arm (sketch)
 15. Rezitativ und Arie: Burg meiner Väter; O Vater der Güte (sketch)
 16a. Rezitativ und Duett mit Chor: Wo ist er?; Laß ab mir sprengts die Brust (sketch)
 16b. Rezitativ und Chor: Doch sprich, wo ist mein süßer Knabe? (sketch)
 17a. Terzett: Das Zeichen wars, das er versprach (sketch)
 17b. Rezitativ und Quintett: Oh sieh, sie kommt; Meine Arme öffnen sich (sketch)
 18. Lied mit Chor: Vor Allem müßt ihr wissen (sketch)
 19. Quartett: Gratulire! nun ich habe nichts dagegen (sketch)
 20a. Rezitativ und Arie: Sie schläft; Deine Liebe, deine Milde (sketch)
 20b. Duett: Wohlan! Sprich zu dem frommen Kinde (sketch)
 20c. Arie: Gütter Gott nimm aus dem Herzen (sketch)
 20d. Rezitativ und Duett: Angelika!; Schlage nicht die Augen nieder (sketch)
 20e. Terzett: Ihr seyd bewegt was ist geschehen? (sketch)
 20f. Quintett: Es geht schön im Kreise der volle Pokal (sketch)

Recordings

References

1827 operas
German-language operas
Operas by Franz Schubert
Operas
Unfinished operas